Diogo Island known as Di'nem Island is an uninhabited volcanic island in the province of Batanes, the northernmost province in the Philippines.  Also known as Di'nem Island in the native language, Diogo is a lone rock rising out of the sea, with steep cliffs on every side, and dangerous currents make landing there practically impossible.  It is an extinct volcano which has suffered heavily from marine erosion.

Geography
It is steep on the western side but has several small islets lying off the eastern side, the outermost being nearly  distant.

Geology
In 1903, Diogo Island was observed to be volcanic, discharging vapor and dark material, but another observation in 1908 believe that those are small clouds which often hang around the mountain.  It is listed as an inactive volcano by the Philippine Institute of Volcanology and Seismology.

Previous names
In old Spanish maps, the name of the island was listed as Isla Diego or Rodonta.

See also

 List of islands of the Philippines
 List of islands
 Desert island

References

Volcanoes of the Luzon Strait
Inactive volcanoes of the Philippines
Islands of Batanes
Uninhabited islands of the Philippines